The Parnaíba (Parnahyba) was a Brazilian cargo ship sunk during World War II by the German submarine  on May 1, 1942, while sailing east of Trinidad and Tobago in the Atlantic Ocean, carrying coffee, cocoa, castor bean oil, cotton, and other commodities.

She was the seventh ship attacked since the beginning of the conflict and the sixth after Brazil interrupted diplomatic relations with the Axis in January 1942. Seven people were killed in the episode.

The ship 
After her construction was completed in 1913 at the shipyard of Flensburger Schiffsbau Gesellschaft in Flensburg, Germany, she was launched under the name Alrich and operated by Roland Linie of Bremen. 

The ship was in the Port of Rio de Janeiro when World War I broke out, which led to her retention and later confiscation by the Brazilian Government on June 1, 1917, when Brazil broke diplomatic relations with the German Empire.

She was renamed Parnaíba (Parnahyba) and registered in Rio de Janeiro under number 17, being operated, from 1923, by Lloyd Brasileiro, which acquired full ownership of her in 1927.

The sinking 
On May 1, 1942, after almost two months without attacks on Brazilian ships (since the sinking of the Cairu on March 8), the Parnaíba, commanded by Captain Raul Francisco Diégoli, was east of the island of Trinidad and Tobago and north of the Guianas (coordinates: 10° 12' N 57° 16' W), loaded with 40,950 bags of coffee, 30,000 of cocoa, 27,155 of bran, 25,000 bales of leather, 17,585 of castor beans, and 15,108 of miscellaneous cargo, totaling 155,739 volumes. 

She left Rio de Janeiro on April 5, with a stop in Recife, from where the cargo ship sailed on April 24, bound for New York City, unescorted but armed with a cannon. On board were 72 people, including three sailors in charge of surveillance.

Shortly before 3 p.m. (8:46 p.m. The impact opened a breach in the engine room and instantly killed all the crew members there: the 3rd engineer, three firemen, and two coal miners.

With the ship stopped, the crew began to descend to the three remaining jolly-boats – a fourth one was lost in the explosion. In the meantime, while a distress call was being issued by Captain Diégoli who was still on board, a second torpedo hit the ship, and soon afterward the Germans fired several cannon shots at Parnahyba.

Despite the torpedoing and cannon fire, the ship only fully submerged after three hours, at dusk, not before being hit by two more torpedoes fired by the U-boat. The survivors witnessed another shocking scene: a radio telegrapher, who had lingered on the ship, jumped into the water to reach the boats. In addition to swimming well, he was wearing a life jacket, which enabled him to quickly reach the lifeboats. However, when he brought his arm to the edge, a shark pulled him to the bottom of the sea. He was never seen again, leaving his companions in a state of shock.

The rescue 
In the jolly-boats, the survivors saw the weather change dramatically. The wind intensified and large waves nearly sank the small boats. The captain set a course for the three boats, expecting to reach land in a week at the most. At dawn, under heavy rain and extreme cold, the castaways were sighted by an American warplane, which landed to offer water and supplies.

An hour later, the same seaplane flew over the jolly-boats and dropped luminous parachutes over them so that they could be located. Half an hour later, guided by those reference points, the Spanish ship Cabo Hornos appeared on the scene and rescued the personnel from two boats. In turn, the Canadian freighter Turret Cap rescued the crew of the third boat. All 65 survivors were taken to Georgetown, the capital of Guyana.

References 

Cargo ships of Brazil
1913 ships
Maritime incidents in May 1942